Jonathan D. Jones (born August 2, 1989) is an American former professional baseball outfielder who played internationally for the Mexico national baseball team at the 2020 Olympics.

Amateur career
Jones graduated from Vanden High School in Fairfield, California, in 2007. He attended California State University, Long Beach, where he played college baseball for the Long Beach State Dirtbags. In 2009, he played collegiate summer baseball with the Yarmouth–Dennis Red Sox of the Cape Cod Baseball League.

Professional career

Minor leagues
Jones was selected by the Toronto Blue Jays in the 29th round of the 2010 MLB draft. He made his professional debut in 2010 with the Gulf Coast Blue Jays, and was later promoted to Class A Short Season Auburn Doubledays. In 2011, Jones split the season between the Class A Short Season Vancouver Canadians and Single-A Lansing Lugnuts, posting a combined .288/.366/.360 line with 2 home runs and 41 RBIs. He was promoted in 2012 to the High-A Dunedin Blue Jays, batting .266 with 28 RBIs and 25 stolen bases. Following the 2012 season, he played winter ball with the Canberra Cavalry of the Australian Baseball League. Jones appeared in 8 games for the Cavalry before a hamstring injury ended his season prematurely.

In 2013, Jones began the season in Dunedin, spending the year there aside from a short stint with the Double-A New Hampshire Fisher Cats. In 2014, López was promoted to the Fisher Cats, where he slashed .233/.302/.314 with 1 home run and 14 RBIs in 56 games. On September 30, 2014, Jones was released by the organization.

On October 8, 2014, Jones signed a minor league contract with the Miami Marlins organization. He was released prior to the season on March 31, 2015.

Independent & Mexican leagues
Jones signed with the Gary SouthShore RailCats of the American Association of Independent Professional Baseball for the 2015 season. He hit a team-leading .314, tied for the team lead in home runs (5), and was second on the club with 40 RBIs.

On March 28, 2016, Jones was traded to the New Britain Bees of the Atlantic League of Professional Baseball for future considerations. In 72 games, he slashed .269/.307/.405 with 5 home runs, 33 RBIs, and 24 stolen bases. He became a free agent following the season.

On June 15, 2017, Jones signed with the Vaqueros Unión Laguna of the Mexican League. In 72 games with the club, he slashed .245/.342/.412 with 8 home runs and 37 RBIs. He returned to the team, re-named the Algodoneros de Unión Laguna, for first half of the 2018 season. On July 26, 2018, Jones was traded to the Leones de Yucatán of the Mexican League. He played in 29 games with the Leones to finish out the year, batting .222/.316/.394 with 2 home runs and 14 RBIs. Jones later stayed in Mexico to play for the Cañeros de Los Mochis of the Mexican Pacific League.

In 2019, Jones returned to Yucatán, setting career highs in hits (138), RBIs (55), and stolen bases (31) across 97 games played. He re-signed in 2020, but the season was later canceled due to the COVID-19 pandemic. Jones again re-signed with the Leones for the 2021 season. Appearing in just 18 games as a result of injuries and his Team Mexico commitments, he slashed .217/.294/.300 with 1 home run and 5 RBIs.

On November 3, 2021, Jones announced his retirement from professional baseball.

International career
In 2019, Jones was selected to Team Mexico at the 2019 WBSC Premier12 competition. He is African-American, but of Mexican heritage on his mother's side and therefore eligible to represent Mexico. Playing in 8 games, Jones batted .385 (5th-best) and hit 3 home runs (tied for 1st). He was the only player from Team Mexico to be named to the All-World Team. Mexico finished the tournament with a victory in the bronze medal game over the United States, thereby qualifying for the 2020 Summer Olympics

Jones would be selected to the final roster for the Mexico national baseball team at the 2020 Summer Olympics.

References

External links

Living people
1989 births
People from Fairfield, California
Baseball players from California
Baseball outfielders
Long Beach State Dirtbags baseball players
Yarmouth–Dennis Red Sox players
Gulf Coast Blue Jays players
Auburn Doubledays players
Lansing Lugnuts players
Vancouver Canadians players
Dunedin Blue Jays players
New Hampshire Fisher Cats players
Canberra Cavalry players
Gary SouthShore RailCats players
New Britain Bees players
Vaqueros Unión Laguna players
Algodoneros de Unión Laguna players
Leones de Yucatán players
Cañeros de Los Mochis players
2019 WBSC Premier12 players
American expatriate baseball players in Canada
American expatriate baseball players in Mexico
African-American baseball players
American baseball players of Mexican descent
American people of Mexican descent
Baseball players at the 2020 Summer Olympics
People from Vacaville, California
Olympic baseball players of Mexico
21st-century African-American sportspeople
20th-century African-American people